Love in Singapore is a 1980 Indian Malayalam-language film, directed by Baby. The film stars Prem Nazir, Jayan, Jose Prakash and Latha. The film has musical score by Shankar–Ganesh. This movie upon release gained positive reviews and became a commercial success. It was remade in Telugu with the same name.

Plot 
Premkumar(Nazir) and Sureh(Jayan) are brothers. One night the brothers fight and the father(Prathapachandran as SI Krishnan Nair) hits the younger brother and he leaves the house in anger. The same night a villain comes to their house(Sethu played by Jose Prakash) and kills the father as revenge for sending the villain to jail.

Premkumar grows up to be a police officer just like his father and is sent to Singapore to track down a jewel-encrusted ancient sword stolen from the local temple. Suresh is in Singapore and has a Chinese girlfriend. Prem meets and falls in love with Sudha whose father is held captive by Sethu who is behind the theft of the sword. The brothers meet and recognize each other. The brothers are held captive by Sethu while they were trying to escape with the sword. The brothers escape and chase down Sethu and returns to India with the sword.

Cast 
Prem Nazir as Premkumar
Jayan as Suresh
 Madeline Teo as Madeline
Jose Prakash as Rowdy Sethu
Latha as Sudha
Kaviyoor Ponnamma as Mother of Premkumar
Prathapachandran as SI Krishnan Nair, Father of Premkumar
 Steven Thoo
 Peter Chong

Soundtrack 
The music was composed by Shankar–Ganesh and the lyrics were written by Ettumanoor Sreekumar.

References

External links 
 

1970 films
1970s Malayalam-language films
Films directed by Baby (director)
Films scored by Shankar–Ganesh
Indian films about revenge
Malayalam films remade in other languages